José A. Rosario Meléndez (born November 27, 1967) is a Puerto Rican politician and the former mayor of Cataño. Rosario is affiliated with the Popular Democratic Party (PPD) and has served as mayor since 2009.

References

External links
José Rosario Profile on WAPA-TV

Living people
1967 births
Mayors of places in Puerto Rico
People from San Juan, Puerto Rico
Popular Democratic Party (Puerto Rico) politicians
People from Cataño, Puerto Rico